The General-Western Meteor, also called the Air Transport Mfg Meteor, Phantom Meteor and the Bantam Meteor was a parasol wing aircraft.

Design and development
The P-2-S was built at Goleta Airport after development of the P-1 at the General-Western plant at Santa Barbara Municipal airport. It received its American type certificate on 6 May 1932. The aircraft was one of the earliest examples built with all-metal propellers. Rights to the design were sold to the Air Transport Mfg Co. in 1935

The P-2-S is a high-wing, conventional landing gear equipped, parasol-wing aircraft powered by a  Kinner radial engine.

Operational history
The prototype was destroyed in testing in 1930.

Variants
P-1
single seat prototype
P-2-S
Two seat sport model
P-2-T
Trainer model
Crop duster
One example was modified into a cropduster with a  Continental engine upgrade.

Specifications (General-Western P-2-S Meteor)

References

External links

Image of a P-2 Meteor
Image of a P-2 Meteor
Image of a P-2 Meteor

Single-engined tractor aircraft